Centrioncus is a genus of stalk-eyed flies in the family Diopsidae.

Species
C. aberrans Feijen, 1983
C. angusticercus Feijen, 1983
C. bytebieri De Meyer, 2004
C. decellei Feijen, 1983
C. decoronotus Feijen, 1983
C. jacobae Feijen, 1983
C. prodiopsis Speiser, 1910

References

Diopsidae
Diopsoidea genera